Lelíček in the Services of Sherlock Holmes is a 1932 Czech comedy film directed by Karel Lamač, starring Vlasta Burian.

Cast
 Vlasta Burian as František Lelíček/King Fernando XXIII
 Martin Frič as Sherlock Holmes
 Fred Bulín as Servant James
 Lída Baarová as Queen/Queen's double
 Čeněk Šlégl as Royal marshall
 Eva Jansenová as Queen's companion Conchita
 Theodor Pištěk as Prime minister Count Mendoza
 Eman Fiala as Photographer/Composer
 Zvonimir Rogoz as Royal officer

References

External links
 

1932 films
1932 comedy films
Films directed by Karel Lamač
Sherlock Holmes films
Czechoslovak multilingual films
Czechoslovak comedy films
Czechoslovak black-and-white films
Czech black-and-white films
1932 multilingual films
1930s Czech films
Czech action comedy films